Feels Like Today is the third studio album by American country music group Rascal Flatts. It was released on September 28, 2004, via Lyric Street Records. The album has sold 5.274 million copies in the United States as of July 2014, and it has been certified 5× Multi-Platinum by the RIAA. The album produced its title track as a single along with "Bless the Broken Road", "Fast Cars and Freedom", and "Skin (Sarabeth)". "Bless the Broken Road" was initially recorded by the Nitty Gritty Dirt Band, and has also been recorded by Marcus Hummon, Melodie Crittenden (whose version was a number 42 country single in 1997), and Geoff Moore before the release of Rascal Flatts' version. It would later be a Top 5 Christian hit for Selah as well. "When the Sand Runs Out" was later recorded by Marty Raybon on his 2006 album of the same name.

"Skin (Sarabeth)", initially a hidden track, received enough airplay to enter Top 40 on the country charts in 2005, leading to its release as a single. Upon its release to radio, "Skin (Sarabeth)" was officially added to the track list. "Here's to You" also charted from unsolicited airplay, and was made into a music video.

This was the band's last album to be produced by Mark Bright.

Track listing

Personnel 
Rascal Flatts
 Jay DeMarcus – bass guitar, backing vocals
 Gary LeVox – lead vocals
 Joe Don Rooney – electric guitar, backing vocals

Additional musicians
 Tim Akers – keyboards, synthesizers, accordion
 Gordon Mote – acoustic piano, Hammond B3 organ
 Steve Nathan – acoustic piano, Hammond B3 organ
 Larry Beaird – acoustic guitar
 Tom Bukovac – electric guitar
 Jerry McPherson – electric guitar
 Paul Franklin – steel guitar
 Lonnie Wilson – drums
 Jonathan Yudkin – banjo, fiddle, mandolin, octofone,  strings on "Feels Like Today" and "Skin (Sarabeth)"

Production 
 Mark Bright – producer 
 Marty Williams – producer, engineer, mixing 
 Rascal Flatts – producers
 Doug Howard – A&R 
 Bart Morris – engineer, assistant engineer, mix assistant, digital editing 
 Tom Baker – mastering
 Gene Dries – production coordinator
 Greg McCarn – creative director
 Glenn Sweitzer – art direction, design 
 Chapman Baehler – photography
 Jennifer Kemp – wardrobe 
 Rhonda Parman – hair stylist, make-up

Chart performance

Weekly charts

Year-end charts

Singles

Certifications

References

2004 albums
Rascal Flatts albums
Lyric Street Records albums
Albums produced by Mark Bright (record producer)